The Shanghai–Wuhan high-speed train is a high-speed train service between Shanghai and Wuhan, the capital of Hubei Province. Trains are operated by CR Shanghai, CR Wuhan and CR Xi'an.

History

The CRH service between Shanghai and Wuhan started on 1 April 2009, when the D-series trains commenced operations between the two cities.

The high-speed train service (G-series trains) between Shanghai and Wuhan commenced on 28 December 2013, reducing the travel time to 4-5 hours.

Operations
The G598/599, G1720/1721 and G1724/1725 trains towards Wuhan and the G600/597, G1722/1719 and G1726/1723 trains offer faster service with fewer intermediate stops, and are called "benchmark trains". Other trains have more stops and longer travelling times.

According to the train numbering rules of China Railway, odd numbers are for south or west bound trains and even numbers are for north or east bound trains. The trains from Shanghai to Wuhan travel northbound on Beijing–Shanghai HSR and westbound on Shanghai–Wuhan–Chengdu HSR, and the trains from Wuhan to Shanghai travel eastbound on Shanghai–Wuhan–Chengdu HSR and southbound on Beijing–Shanghai HSR. Therefore, all the train services on this route have 2 train numbers for the same service.

● : stop at the station
↓: pass the station
—: out of service range
  : Benchmark train

Shanghai → Wuhan

Wuhan → Shanghai

Rolling stock

The services are operated with CRH380AL, CRH380BL and CR400AF trainsets.

References

China Railway passenger services
Passenger rail transport in China
Railway services introduced in 2013